Fire in the Night is a 1955 Norwegian drama film directed by Arne Skouen. It was entered into the 1955 Cannes Film Festival.

Plot 
Tim is a proofreader at a newspaper in Oslo by day, and a pyromaniac at night. Only one other knows about Tim's dark side: his childhood friend and editor of the newspaper. The two have kept the secret for years until the secretary, Margrethe, finds out. Eager to help she becomes Tim's confidant.

Cast
 Claes Gill as Tim
 Elisabeth Bang as Margrethe, sosialsekretær
 Harald Heide Steen as Tims barndomsvenn
 Gudrun Waadeland as Korrekturass
 Thor Hjorth-Jenssen as Journalist
 Helge Essmar as Redaksjonssekretær
 Harald Aimarsen as Redaksjonsmedarb

References

External links

1955 films
1950s Norwegian-language films
1955 drama films
Norwegian black-and-white films
Films directed by Arne Skouen
Norwegian drama films